Michael Stich defeated Pete Sampras in the final, 7–6(7–3), 2–6, 7–6(9–7), 6–2 to win the singles tennis title at the 1993 ATP Tour World Championships.

Boris Becker was the reigning champion, but failed to qualify that year.

Seeds

Draw

Finals

Arthur Ashe group
Standings are determined by: 1. number of wins; 2. number of matches; 3. in two-players-ties, head-to-head records; 4. in three-players-ties, percentage of sets won, or of games won; 5. steering-committee decision.

Stan Smith group

See also
 ATP World Tour Finals appearances

References
 ATP Tour World Championships Singles Draw

Singles
Tennis tournaments in Germany
1993 in German tennis
Sports competitions in Frankfurt